Imesh is a Sinhalese masculine given name. Notable people with the name include:

Imesh Madushanka (born 1998), Sri Lankan cricketer
Imesh Udayanga (born 1990), Sri Lankan cricketer

Sinhalese masculine given names